Pellifronia brianhayesi is a species of sea snail, a marine gastropod mollusk in the family Terebridae, the auger snails.

Description
The length of the shell attains 22.6 mm.

Distribution
This marine species occurs off Southern Mozambique.

References

 Terryn Y. & Holford M. (2008) The Terebridae of Vanuatu with a revision of the genus Granuliterebra, Oyama 1961. Visaya Supplement 3: 1-96.

Terebridae
Gastropods described in 2008